Eevamaria Porthan-Broddell (born 16 December 1978 in Helsinki, Finland) is a Finnish dressage rider. Representing Finland, she competed at the 2014 World Equestrian Games and at two European Dressage Championships (in 2001 and 2015).

Her current best championship result is 13th place in team dressage at the 2015 European Dressage Championships in Aachen while her current best individual championship result is 42nd place from the 2001 Europeans held in Verden.

References

Living people
1978 births
Finnish female equestrians
Finnish dressage riders
Sportspeople from Helsinki